Ilex arnhemensis is the only species of Ilex (holly) native to Australia. Native to coastal and riverine habitats in the tropical north of Western Australia, the Northern Territory and Queensland, it grows as a tree up to 25 metres high.

This species was first published by Ferdinand von Mueller in 1861, under the name Byronia arnhemensis; and transferred in Ilex in 1890. Vernacular names include northern holly.

References

 
 

arnhemensis
Asterids of Australia
Eudicots of Western Australia
Flora of the Northern Territory
Flora of Queensland
Taxa named by Ferdinand von Mueller